Best dressed may refer to:
MTV Movie Award for Best Dressed
International Best Dressed List
Best Dressed Chicken in Town

See also
Worst dressed